Comstock Compass High School is an alternative high school in the Comstock Public School District in  Kalamazoo, Michigan designed for non-traditional students who have struggled in traditional high school programs.  As of 2011 the school had a staff of eight teachers and an enrollment of 210 high school students and 70 adult education students.

In 2009, Compass adopted the Michigan Merit Curriculum, which requires students pass a core of classes which includes Algebra 2, Physics, and Chemistry; students need 19 total credits to graduate.  After the 2009-2010 school year, the school did not meet Adequate Yearly Progress standards for the state of Michigan.

Compass offers an online curriculum as well as a dual enrollment program that allows high school students to receive college credit from Kalamazoo Valley Community College.  Additionally, it offers a General Educational Development (GED) program and a Certified Nursing Assistant (CNA) training program.

References 

Public high schools in Michigan
Alternative schools in the United States
Adult education in the United States
Schools in Kalamazoo, Michigan
1979 establishments in Michigan